Lithocarpus dodonaeifolius is a species of tree in the family Fagaceae. It is endemic to Taiwan and only occurs in the Hengchun Peninsula in the extreme south of the country.

Lithocarpus dodonaeifolius is similar to L. formosanus, and their identity as separate species has been questioned. Molecular genetic methods suggest that they are closely related but distinct species.

References

dodonaeifolius
Endemic flora of Taiwan
Trees of Taiwan
Endangered flora of Asia
Plants described in 1913
Taxonomy articles created by Polbot